Dylan Bregeon (born February 1994) is a French professional boxer. As an amateur he won a bronze medal at the 2013 Universiade.
As a pro he won a French cruiserweight title against Olivier Vautrain.

References

External links

1994 births
Living people
French male boxers
Cruiserweight boxers
Medalists at the 2013 Summer Universiade
Universiade bronze medalists for France
Universiade medalists in boxing